The Abbreviated Mental Test score (AMTS) is a 10-point test for rapidly assessing elderly patients for the possibility of dementia. It was first used in 1972, and is now sometimes also used to assess for mental confusion (including delirium) and other cognitive impairments.

A 4-item version called the Abbreviated Mental Test - 4 (AMT4) has been developed and tested.

Questionnaire
The following questions are put to the patient. Each question correctly answered scores one point. A score of 7–8 or less suggests cognitive impairment at the time of testing, although further and more formal tests are necessary to confirm a diagnosis of dementia, delirium or other causes of cognitive impairment. Culturally-specific questions may vary based on region.

Abbreviated Mental Test - 4 (AMT4) 
The AMT4 uses 4 items from the AMTS: (i) What is your age? (ii) What is your date of birth? (iii) What is the name of this place? (iv) What is the year? A cut off score of 3/4 performs comparably to an AMTS cut-off score of 8/9. The AMT4 is part of the 4AT scale for delirium.

See also
General Practitioner Assessment Of Cognition – a brief screening tool for cognitive impairment designed for primary care
GERRI
Mini-mental state examination

References

Cognitive impairment and dementia screening and assessment tools
Geriatrics